Kim Jun-Hyun  (born January 20, 1964) is a South Korean footballer

He graduated in Yonsei University, He was the Top Assistor of K-League

Honours

Player
 Yukong Elephants
 K-League Winners (1) : 1989

Individual
 1991 : K-League Top Assistor

References
 Kim Jun-Hyun introduction

External links
 

K League 1 players
Busan IPark players
Jeju United FC players
South Korean footballers
1965 births
Living people
Association football midfielders